Vinanivao is a town and commune in northern Madagascar. It belongs to the district of Antalaha, which is a part of Sava Region. According to 2001 commune census the population of Vinanivao was 14,906.

Only primary schooling is available in town. The majority 75% of the population are farmers, while an additional 20% receives their livelihood from raising livestock. The most important crop is cloves, while other important products are rice and vanilla.  Additionally fishing employs 5% of the population.

References and notes 

Populated places in Sava Region